The 2009 H1 Unlimited season is the fifty fourth running of the H1 Unlimited series for unlimited hydroplane, jointly sanctioned by APBA, its governing body in North America and UIM, its international body. It is the first season to run under its new name.

The season began in July with the Madison Regatta, held in Madison, Indiana, United States, throughout the season, the series will consist of six races.

The finale of the season was in November with the Oryx Cup, held in Doha, Ad Dawhah, Qatar. The 2009 Oryx Cup was the seventeenth running of the UIM World Championship for unlimited hydroplanes.

For 2010, Oh Boy! Oberto (Miss Madison) was the National High Point Team Champion, while Steve David was the National High Point Driver Champion.

Name change
The series became H1 Unlimited prior to the Oryx Cup, in a bid to internationalise the series, until then, the series was known as ABRA Unlimited (American Boat Racing Association) for five seasons.

Teams and drivers
All boats are powered by Lycoming T55 L7C, originally used in Chinook helicopters, only turbine engine currently permitted in the series.

Season schedule and results

National High Point Champions

Team Champion

For the 2009 Season, Oh Boy! Oberto (Miss Madison) was the National High Point Team Champion.

Driver Champion

For the 2009 Season, Steve David was the National High Point Driver Champion.

References

External links
 H1 Unlimited Website

Hydro
H1 Unlimited
H1 Unlimited seasons